Calder Vale is an English village, located on the edge of the Forest of Bowland in Lancashire.  It lies on the River Calder in a deep valley with only a single road providing vehicular access. The name Calder is thought to be derived from the Old Norse kaldr, which means "cold".

The village was founded by Quakers Jonathan and Richard Jackson, and in 1835 a cotton-weaving mill — the Lappet Mill — was built, powered by the River Calder. The mill and mill pond still exist and Lappet Mill is still working as a cotton mill. One of its main products is the red, black and white checked cloth used for Arab headscarves and it was said that Yasser Arafat's headdresses  were made at the Mill. The Jackson brothers also built many of the terraced houses still in occupation close to the mills.

The church of St. John the Evangelist lies high above the village, linked to it by a woodland footpath. It was consecrated on 12 August 1863. It serves the adjacent village of Oakenclough, in addition to Calder Vale.

The village also contains a primary school, Calder Vale Church of England School, which was built concurrently with the church. It is a small school consisting of two teachers and about 30 pupils, and it is situated next door to St. John's Church, the two being very closely linked.

There is also a village hall and a Methodist chapel in the village centre. The village also has Scouts and Brownies, a Women's Institute, which meets monthly in the village hall, and a Village Club.

There is a post office within the village hall. 

Every Sunday in May, the villagers get together and organise the "BlueBell Teas", at which cakes, sandwiches and local produce are sold for charity, and for the upkeep of the village hall and mission room. On the second Saturday of June every year, there is a village festival.

The elected Member for Wyre Borough Council's Calder Ward is Councillor David Meirion Williams.

Governance
The village falls in the electoral ward of Calder. This ward stretches south-east to Barnacre. The total ward population at the 2011 census was 2,148.

Gallery

See also

Listed buildings in Barnacre-with-Bonds

References

Further reading

External links

Calder Vale School

Villages in Lancashire
Geography of the Borough of Wyre
Forest of Bowland
Model villages